The Thomas Crown Affair is a 1968 American heist film directed and produced by Norman Jewison and starring Steve McQueen and Faye Dunaway. It was nominated for two Academy Awards, winning Best Original Song for Michel Legrand's "The Windmills of Your Mind". A remake was released in 1999.

Plot
Millionaire businessman-sportsman Thomas Crown accomplishes a perfect crime by orchestrating four men to steal $2,660,527.62 from a Boston bank ($ in  dollars ), along with a fifth man who drives the getaway car with the money and dumps it in a cemetery trash can. None of the men ever meet Crown face to face, nor do they know or meet each other before the robbery. Crown retrieves the money from the trash can after secretly following the driver of the getaway car. He deposits the money into an anonymous Swiss bank account in Geneva, making several trips, never depositing the money all at once so as not to draw undue attention to his actions.

Independent insurance investigator Vicki Anderson is contracted to investigate the heist; she will receive 10% of the stolen money if she recovers it. When Thomas first comes to her attention as a possible suspect, she intuitively recognizes him as the mastermind behind the robbery, and shortly thereafter guesses that he organized the robbers so none of the men knew him or met each other.

Thomas does not need the money, and in fact masterminded the robbery as a game. Vicki makes it clear to him that she knows that he is the thief and that she intends to prove it. They start a game of cat and mouse, with the attraction between them evident. Their relationship soon evolves into an affair, complicated by Vicki's vow to find the money and help detective Eddy Malone bring the guilty party to justice.

A reward offer entices the wife of the bank robbery's getaway driver, Erwin Weaver to "fink" on him for $25,000 ($ in  dollars ). Vicki finds out that he was hired by a man he never saw, but whose voice he heard (via a microphone). She tries putting Erwin in the same room as Thomas, but there is no hint of recognition on either one's part.

However, while Vicki is clearly closing in on Thomas, using the Internal Revenue Service (IRS) as leverage against his liquid assets, he forces her to realize that she is also becoming hemmed-in by her emotions. When she (seemingly) persuades him to negotiate an end, his point is proven when Eddy stubbornly refuses to make any deal.

Thomas organizes another robbery exactly like the first with different accomplices and tells Vicki where the "drop" will be, because he has to know for sure that she is on his side. The robbery is successful, but there are gunshots and the viewer is left with the impression that people might have been killed, raising the stakes for Vicki's decision.

Vicki and the police stake out the cemetery, where they watch one of the robbers make the drop and they wait for Thomas to arrive so they can arrest him. However, when his Rolls-Royce arrives, she sees that Thomas has sent a messenger in his place, with a telegram asking her to bring the money and join him – or if not, "you keep the car". She tears the telegram to bits and throws the pieces to the wind, looking up at the sky with tears in her eyes. Crown flies away in a jet.

Cast

Production
The photography is unusual for a mainstream Hollywood film, using a split-screen mode. The use of split screens to show simultaneous actions was inspired by the breakthrough Expo 67 films In the Labyrinth and A Place to Stand, the latter of which pioneered the use of Christopher Chapman's "multi-dynamic image technique", images shifting on moving panes. Steve McQueen was on hand for an advance screening of A Place to Stand in Hollywood and personally told Chapman he was highly impressed; the following year, Norman Jewison had incorporated the technique into the film, inserting the scenes into the already finished product.

The film also features a chess scene, with McQueen and Dunaway playing a game of chess, silently flirting with each other. The game depicted is based on a game played in Vienna in 1898 between Gustav Zeissl and Walter von Walthoffen.

McQueen undertook his own stunts, which include playing polo and driving a dune buggy at high speed along the Massachusetts coastline. In an interview, McQueen would later say this was his favorite film.

Vicki Anderson's car, referred to as "one of those red Italian things," (the Alfa Romeo Spider was the marque frequently distinguished as such), is the first of only ten Ferrari 275 GTB/4S NART Spiders built. Today, this model is one of the most valuable Ferrari road cars of all time. McQueen liked the car very much, and eventually managed to acquire one for himself. The dune buggy was a Meyers Manx, built in California on a VW beetle floor pan with a hopped-up Chevrolet Corvair engine. McQueen owned one, and the Manx, the original dune buggy, was often copied. Crown's two-door Rolls-Royce Silver Shadow carried Massachusetts vanity license tag "TC 100" for the film.

Sean Connery had been the original choice for the title role, but turned it down—a decision he later regretted. In the 1999 remake, the title role was portrayed by another actor who had portrayed James Bond, Pierce Brosnan.

Filming locations
The movie was filmed primarily on location in Boston and surrounding areas in Massachusetts and New Hampshire:
 Second Harrison Gray Otis House at 85 Mt. Vernon St. on Beacon Hill, designed by Massachusetts State House architect Charles Bulfinch in 1800 for Congressman Harrison Gray Otis, was Thomas Crown's residence.
 The robbery occurred in what was then the Beverly National Bank (fictitiously renamed Boston Mercantile Bank for the film), at the North Beverly Plaza, Beverly, Massachusetts, and 55 Congress St., Boston. The current location is noted as 44 Water Street, the offices of private investment firm Brown Brothers. The interiors were renovated and partially restored in 1999 by the firm GHK, Malcolm Higbee-Glace, Project Manager
 A scene of the car theft was filmed in downtown Beverly across from City Hall
 The money-dumpings were shot in Mount Auburn Cemetery, Coolidge Ave., Cambridge
 The polo sequences were filmed at the Myopia Hunt Club, 435 Bay Road, South Hamilton
 The golf sequences were filmed at the Belmont Country Club, 181 Winter St., Belmont
 The auctions took place in the St. James Ballroom at the Eben Jordan Mansion, 46 Beacon St., Beacon Hill
 Thomas drove his dune buggy on Crane Beach in Ipswich, Massachusetts
 The Schweizer SGS 1-23H glider was flown at Salem, New Hampshire. by Roy McMaster (not Steve McQueen)
 The meat shop scene took place at Blackstone and North streets in Boston's North End
 Thomas and Vicki walked in the rain in Copp's Hill Cemetery in Boston's North End
 Thomas and Vicki kissed (wearing formal dress) at the top of Acorn Street on Beacon Hill, a narrow, cobblestoned lane often called "the most photographed street in America"

Other locations included:
 the Allston-Brighton tollbooths (demolished in 2016) on the Massachusetts Turnpike
 Anthony's Pier 4 restaurant at 140 Northern Ave. in South Boston's Seaport District
 the Boston Common
 the old Boston Police Headquarters on Berkeley Street (since renovated as the Loews Boston Hotel)
 Cambridge Street and Linden Street, Allston
 Copp's Hill Terrace in Boston's North End
 the North End Greenmarket
 South Station, 700 Atlantic Ave., Boston
 the Tobin Bridge
 the Prudential Tunnel portion of the Massachusetts Turnpike going under Huntington Avenue (then-future Massachusetts Route 9)—years before the Westin Hotel in Copley Square and the parking garage on Clarendon Street were built over the toll highway in a scene where McQueen was driving the getaway car
 the then-Dewey Square Tunnel (future Interstate 93) where McQueen emerged onto the Massachusetts Turnpike—a feat technically impossible since McQueen drove into the Prudential Tunnel one scene earlier
 the Marliave Restaurant rooftop dining area, Bosworth Street, Boston where Dunaway is shown surveillance photos by Burke of McQueen kissing another woman
 the footpath on the Boston side of the Charles River, between the Weeks Footbridge and the Anderson Bridge with the dome of Dunster House visible in the background on the Cambridge side
 Dulles International Airport, Virginia, with signage making it look as though it were in Boston

Release
The Thomas Crown Affair  had its world premiere in Boston on June 19, 1968, with openings in Los Angeles and New York on June 26, 1968, and a nationwide release in August 1968.

This movie's release introduced United Artists' new logo which showed the iconic Transamerica "T" and the byline, "Entertainment from Transamerica Corporation".

The Thomas Crown Affair made its US television premiere on NBC Saturday Night at the Movies in September 1972.

Home media
The film was released on DVD by MGM Home Entertainment in the United States in February 1999 with two special features, an audio commentary by director Norman Jewison and theatrical trailer. It was first released on Blu-ray Disc on February 1, 2011, with the same extra supplements. On February 13, 2018 Kino Lorber (under license from MGM) released a Blu-ray 50th anniversary edition with six extra features including an original featurette with cast and crew interviews, audio commentary by Film Historian Lem Dobbs and Nick Redman and an interview with the director.

Reception

Box office
The film was successful at the box office, grossing $14 million on a $4.3 million budget.

Critical response
Reviews at the time were mixed. Critics praised the chemistry between McQueen and Dunaway and Norman Jewison's stylish direction, but considered the plotting and writing rather thin. Roger Ebert gave it 2 stars out of four and called it "possibly the most under-plotted, underwritten, over-photographed film of the year. Which is not to say it isn't great to look at. It is." On the film review website Rotten Tomatoes, the film holds a rating of 72% from 36 reviews. The site's consensus simply states that "Steve McQueen settles into the role with ease and aplomb, in a film that whisks viewers into an exotic world with style and sex appeal".

Awards and nominations

Soundtrack

The music was composed and conducted by Michel Legrand, scoring his first major American film. Director Norman Jewison had hoped to hire Henry Mancini for the project, but he was unavailable and recommended Legrand; he wrote his music as long pieces rather than specifically to scene timings, with the film later edited to the music by Legrand, Jewison and editor Hal Ashby. In addition, Legrand also had to prepare an original song to replace "Strawberry Fields Forever," used as the temporary track for the glider scene. Taking Quincy Jones' advice, Legrand worked with the Bergmans to compose "The Windmills of Your Mind" and a second song, "His Eyes, Her Eyes"; Noel Harrison recorded "The Windmills of Your Mind" after Jewison failed to get his friend Andy Williams to do it, while Legrand performed "His Eyes, Her Eyes". While the film's score was recorded in Hollywood, featuring Vincent DeRosa, Bud Shank, Carol Kaye, Emil Richards, Ray Brown and Shelly Manne, the album re-recording issued by United Artists Records on LP was done in France under the composer's baton; Jewison said it was the favourite score for any of his films.

The original album was later reissued by Rykodisc in 1998 on compact disc, with five dialogue excerpts and the inclusion of "Moments Of Love" and "Doubting Thomas." Varèse Sarabande re-released the album in 2004 (without the dialogue excerpts). In 2014, Quartet Records issued a limited edition CD featuring the previously released album tracks (1–13 below) and the premiere release of the film version.

Expanded album track listing
 "The Windmills of Your Mind", performed by Noel Harrison – 2:24
 "Room Service" – 1:41
 "A Man's Castle" – 2:41
 "The Chess Game" – 5:58
 "Cash and Carry" – 2:35
 "His Eyes, Her Eyes", performed by Michel Legrand – 2:17
 "Playing the Field" – 5:48
 "Moments of Love" – 2:19
 "The Boston Wrangler" – 2:49
 "Doubting Thomas" – 3:48
 "The Crowning Touch" – 2:59
 "The Windmills of Your Mind" – 2:22
 "His Eyes, Her Eyes" – 2:15
 "The Windmills of Your Mind", performed by Noel Harrison – 2:25
 "Knock, Knock" – 0:50
 "The Gang" – 3:02
 "Getaway" – 0:52
 "Escapeline" – 1:28
 "Cemetery" – 1:20
 "More Cemetery" – 1:19
 "Enter Vicky" – 0:25
 "The Windmills of Your Mind", performed by Noel Harrison – 1:25
 "Polo" – 0:47
 "Brandy" – 1:33
 "Chess Anyone?" – 4:26
 "Let's Play Something Else" – 1:18
 "Togetherness" – 1:38
 "Don't Bug Me" – 1:15
 "Beach House" – 1:01
 "Love Montage" – 1:21
 "No Deals" – 1:01
 "All My Love, Tommy" – 3:07

In popular culture
The film's famous kissing scene, which is depicted on the film's poster, is famously used in Hal Ashby's Being There (1979).  Ashby was The Thomas Crown Affair'''s associate producer and editor. In 1998, pop star Madonna released a video for her single "The Power of Good-Bye", based on the chess scene from the movie.

Remakes

The 1999 remake stars Pierce Brosnan as Crown, Rene Russo as the insurance investigator, and Denis Leary as the detective. The original film's co-star Faye Dunaway also appears as Crown's therapist.

This version is different from the original in that it is set in New York rather than Boston and the robbery is of a priceless painting, a Monet, instead of cash, among other story line differences, including the complete lack of violence in Thomas Crown's crimes.

In 2016, The Hollywood Reporter'' announced that actor Michael B. Jordan had approached Metro-Goldwyn-Mayer regarding a new remake of the film, with him in the lead role; there was no script nor director at the time of the announcement. As of September 2022, no such remake has been released.

See also
 List of American films of 1968

References

External links
 
 
 
 
 

1968 films
1968 crime drama films
1960s heist films
1968 romantic drama films
American crime drama films
American heist films
American romantic drama films
Films scored by Michel Legrand
Films about bank robbery
Films directed by Norman Jewison
Films set in Boston
Films set in Massachusetts
Films shot in Massachusetts
Films shot in New Hampshire
Films that won the Best Original Song Academy Award
United Artists films
1960s English-language films
1960s American films